Jan Vaník (7 May 1891 – 12 June 1950) was a footballer who appeared for both the Austria and Czechoslovakia national teams. He competed in the men's tournament at the 1920 Summer Olympics. On a club level, he played for AC Sparta Prague and SK Slavia Prague, becoming the top goalscorer of the Czechoslovak First League in the 1925 season.

Club career
Jan Vaník was very interested in the education of young football players and already at Sparta Prague, he took care of the junior side through his own initiative. Later, when he had retired, he helped lead courses for youth leaders. J. Šoltys, J. Čapek, A. Šimperský and J. Čtyřoký, among others, owed their growth to his activities. Also, he helped develop Frantisek Planicka. In 1918 Jan scored a total of 28 goals including friendlies. In 1920, Jan scored a total of 54 goals including friendlies. In 1921, Jan scored a total of 36 goals including friendlies.

References

External links
 

1891 births
1950 deaths
Czech footballers
Czechoslovak footballers
Czechoslovakia international footballers
Olympic footballers of Czechoslovakia
Austrian footballers
Austria international footballers
Footballers at the 1920 Summer Olympics
Footballers from Prague
AC Sparta Prague players
SK Slavia Prague players
Association football forwards
Dual internationalists (football)